Vana-Aespa is a village in Kohila Parish, Rapla County in northern Estonia.

History
Vana-Aespa was established on 20 December 2011 by dividing the village of Aespa in two. The new settlements were the small borough of Aespa and Vana-Aespa village.

References 

Villages in Rapla County
2011 establishments in Estonia
Populated places established in 2011